Lee Ho Ching (born 24 November 1992) is a Hong Kong table tennis player.

She qualified for the 2016 Summer Olympics in Rio de Janeiro, and was selected to represent Hong Kong in the women's singles and the women's team. At the 2020 Summer Olympics, she won a bronze medal with Doo Hoi Kem and Minnie Soo Wai Yam in the women’s team event.

Early years 
Lee graduated from St. Rose of Lima's School and studied at Diocesan Girls' School. She dropped out at 15 years old to pursue a full-time athletic career.

Career

2021 
Lee competed in the Tokyo Olympics in women’s team with Doo Hoi Kem and Minnie Soo Wai Yam. They won bronze after beating Germany with 3-1, earning Hong Kong’s first medal in the Olympics team event and second medal in table tennis.

See also 

 Hong Kong at the 2020 Summer Olympics

References

External links
 

1992 births
Living people
Hong Kong female table tennis players
Olympic table tennis players of Hong Kong
Table tennis players at the 2012 Summer Olympics
Table tennis players at the 2016 Summer Olympics
Asian Games medalists in table tennis
Table tennis players at the 2014 Asian Games
Table tennis players at the 2018 Asian Games
Asian Games silver medalists for Hong Kong
Asian Games bronze medalists for Hong Kong
Medalists at the 2014 Asian Games
Medalists at the 2018 Asian Games
Expatriate table tennis people in Japan
Table tennis players at the 2020 Summer Olympics
Olympic medalists in table tennis
Medalists at the 2020 Summer Olympics
Olympic bronze medalists for Hong Kong
21st-century Hong Kong women